The Gallatin County High School was a public high school in Bozeman, Montana. It was built Romanesque/Classical Revival style in 1902, expanded in c. 1914, and gained an Art Deco addition in 1936–37.  The c.1914 and 1936-37 work was designed by architect Fred F. Willson; it was renamed Willson School following its conversion to a junior high school.

It includes Classical Revival, Art Deco, and Romanesque architecture.  At 404 West Main Street, it was listed on the National Register of Historic Places  in 1988.

A 1987 review of the building notes that it "is dominated by a large, rounded, projecting pavilion, which is actually a feature related to the Streamline Moderne style, rather than Art Deco which is the overall style of the building."

GCHS was succeeded by the new Bozeman High School in 1958, located a mile west at 205 North 11th Avenue.

Notable alumni 
Brick Breeden, Montana State basketball coach (and player)
Gary Cooper, film actor
Vern Haugland, journalist, war correspondent
Reno Sales, geologist, "father of mining geology"

References

School buildings on the National Register of Historic Places in Montana
Neoclassical architecture in Montana
Art Deco architecture in Montana
School buildings completed in 1902
Schools in Gallatin County, Montana
Public middle schools in Montana
1902 establishments in Montana
National Register of Historic Places in Gallatin County, Montana
Buildings and structures in Bozeman, Montana
Public high schools in Montana